Mesomys is a genus of South American spiny rats in the family Echimyidae.

It refers to the fact that this rodent — literally the "middle mouse" — has been considered as an intermediate form related both to mice and jumping rats.

Extant Species

Phylogeny
Mesomys is a member of the Echimyini clade of arboreal Echimyidae rodents. The closest relative of Mesomys is Lonchothrix, reflecting the fact that these taxa have once been classified in the Eumysopinae, a subfamily now recognized as an artificial assemblage. These two genera share phylogenetic affinities with several taxa and clades: (i) Echimys, Phyllomys, Makalata, Pattonomys, and Toromys ; (ii) the bamboo rats Dactylomys, Olallamys, Kannabateomys together with Diplomys and Santamartamys ; and (iii) Isothrix.

References

 
Rodent genera
Taxa named by Johann Andreas Wagner